Ancylosternus is a genus of beetles in the family Cerambycidae, containing the following species:

 Ancylosternus annulicorne Martins & Galileo, 2010
 Ancylosternus morio (Fabricius, 1787)

References

Trachyderini
Cerambycidae